Passin' Thru is the fifth studio album by James Gang, released in October 1972, and their final album released on ABC Records (catalog no. ABCX 760). The band moved to Atco Records the next year.

This album is the last James Gang recording featuring guitarist Domenic Troiano, who was replaced by Tommy Bolin.

The scene shown on the album's cover is of the 100 block of East Main Avenue in Bismarck, North Dakota in the 1880s. The large building in the background still stands.

Critical reception

Writing for Allmusic, critic Stephen Thomas Erlewine wrote the album "Passin' Thru didn't hit as hard as its predecessor, but it did provide an effective showcase for Troiano's talents."

Track listing
All songs by Roy Kenner & Domenic Troiano, except where noted.
 "Ain't Seen Nothing Yet" – 2:59
 "One Way Street" (Domenic Troiano) – 4:36
 "Had Enough" – 3:00
 "Up to Yourself" (Troiano) – 2:43
 "Everybody Needs a Hero" – 6:06
 "Run Run Run" – 3:44
 "Things I Want to Say to You" (Troiano) – 3:41
 "Out of Control" (Troiano) – 3:39
 "Drifting Girl" – 5:09

Personnel 
Roy Kenner - lead vocals, harmonica, percussion
Domenic Troiano - guitars, backing vocals
Dale Peters - bass guitar, backing vocals
Jim Fox - drums, backing vocals, organ

Guest musicians
David Briggs - piano
Charlie McCoy - harmonica
Weldon Myrick - pedal steel guitar
Craig Sapphin - all strings, arrangements
William D. "Smitty" Smith - piano, organ, harpsichord

Sales chart performance

References

James Gang albums
1972 albums
ABC Records albums
Albums produced by Keith Olsen